is a JR West Geibi Line station located in Hataki, Tessei-chō, Niimi, Okayama Prefecture, Japan.

Description 
Nochi Station is a ground-level one platform station opened on 1930-11-25 when the line between Yagami and Tōjō Stations opened.  Formerly, there were two platforms, and the station could handle two lines at once (see photo on the right).  The station features a ticket window for ease of ticket purchase. The monthly passes and other special tickets can not be purchased at this station.

The Nochi Post Office is located near the station. Japan National Route 182 is accessible from the station as well.

Connecting lines 
All lines are JR West lines.
Geibi Line Yagami Station — Nochi Station — Tōjō Station

External links 
  JR West

Geibi Line
Railway stations in Okayama Prefecture
Railway stations in Japan opened in 1930